Paul Quaye (born 16 September 1995) is a Ghanaian footballer who plays as a defensive midfielder.

Football career
Born in Accra, Quaye joined Espanyol Barcelona's youth setup in 2009, aged 13. He made his senior debuts with the reserves in the 2011–12 campaign, in Segunda División B.

On 11 March 2012, Quaye made his first-team - and La Liga - debut, playing three minutes in a 5–1 home routing against Rayo Vallecano, and being the youngest foreign player to play in the top level. He spent the vast majority of his spell with the B-side, however.

On 13 July 2014 Quaye rescinded with the Pericos and moved to another reserve team, Atlético Malagueño in Tercera División. On 1 September of the following year he joined Elche CF, being assigned to its B-team also in the fourth tier.

References

External links

1995 births
Living people
Footballers from Accra
Ghanaian footballers
Association football midfielders
La Liga players
Segunda División B players
Tercera División players
RCD Espanyol B footballers
RCD Espanyol footballers
Atlético Malagueño players
Elche CF Ilicitano footballers
Slovak Super Liga players
FK Senica players
Ghanaian expatriate footballers
Ghanaian expatriate sportspeople in Spain
Ghanaian expatriate sportspeople in Slovakia
Expatriate footballers in Spain
Expatriate footballers in Slovakia
Aspire Academy (Senegal) players
FC Jumilla players